S-Alternative (in Swedish: S-Alternativet) is a splinter group of the Social Democrats in Pajala, Sweden.

External links
 S-Alternativet Homepage (in Swedish)

Swedish local political parties
Political parties established in 1994
1994 establishments in Sweden
Political schisms